Kim Min-O  (born May 8, 1983) is a South Korean football player.

External links

1983 births
Living people
South Korean footballers
Ulsan Hyundai FC players
Gimcheon Sangmu FC players
K League 1 players
Korea National League players
Association football midfielders